Crow Wing is an unincorporated community in Crow Wing Township, Crow Wing County, Minnesota, United States, south of Brainerd and Baxter. It is along State Highway 371 (MN 371) near 50th Avenue SW and 85th Street. Crow Wing is three miles northeast of Crow Wing State Park and the former town of Old Crow Wing.

References

Unincorporated communities in Crow Wing County, Minnesota
Unincorporated communities in Minnesota